In statistics and machine learning, when one wants to infer a random variable with a set of variables, usually a subset is enough, and other variables are useless. Such a subset that contains all the useful information is called a Markov blanket. If a Markov blanket is minimal, meaning that it cannot drop any variable without losing information, it is called a Markov boundary. Identifying a Markov blanket or a Markov boundary helps to extract useful features. The terms of Markov blanket and Markov boundary were coined by Judea Pearl in 1988. A Markov blanket can be constituted by a set of Markov chains.

Markov blanket 

In general, a given Markov blanket is not unique. Any set in  that contains a Markov blanket is also a Markov blanket itself.

Markov boundary 
In other words, a Markov boundary is a minimal Markov blanket.

The Markov boundary of a node  in a Bayesian network is the set of nodes composed of 's parents, 's children, and 's children's other parents. In a Markov random field, the Markov boundary for a node is the set of its neighboring nodes. In a dependency network, the Markov boundary for a node is the set of its parents.

Uniqueness of Markov boundary 
The Markov boundary always exists. Under some mild conditions, the Markov boundary is unique. However, for most practical and theoretical scenarios multiple Markov boundaries may provide alternative solutions. When there are multiple Markov boundaries, quantities measuring causal effect could fail.

See also 
 Andrey Markov
 Free energy minimisation
 Moral graph
 Separation of concerns
 Causality
 Causal inference

Notes

Bayesian networks
Markov networks